Charles Hawkins (20 June 1817 – 9 September 1846) was an English professional cricketer who played first-class cricket from 1838 to 1845.

A right-handed batsman and wicket-keeper who was mainly associated with Sussex and Marylebone Cricket Club (MCC), he made 44 known appearances in first-class matches.  He represented the Players in the Gentlemen v Players series.

References

1817 births
1846 deaths
English cricketers
English cricketers of 1826 to 1863
Marylebone Cricket Club cricketers
Sussex cricketers
Players cricketers
Petworth cricketers
Gentlemen cricketers
Gentlemen of Nottinghamshire cricketers
Fast v Slow cricketers